Gergely Sárközy is a Hungarian musician who plays guitar, lute, lute-harpsichord, viola bastarda, and organ. He has produced numerous recordings and has helped in the creation of animated film soundtracks including that of A nyár szemei ("The Eyes of Summer") for which he won an Award for Best Sound Engineering together with Nikolai Ivanov Neikov at the 4th Kecskemét Animation Film Festival.

Recordings

As soloist
J.S. Bach on Viola Bastarda, Lute and Lute-Harpsichord (double CD) (Hungaroton Classic Ltd, 1980, 1984, 1991)
Gergely Sárközy plays Scarlatti Sonatas on guitar, lute, lute-harpsichord, viola bastarda, organ (Hungaroton Classic Ltd)
Chaconne & Passacaglia (Purcell, Bach) (Hungaroton Classic Ltd)
Famous Concerti (Amadis) (alt.)
etc.

References

External links 
Official Homepage www.gergely-sarkozy.com
 The baroque LUTE-HARPSICHORD: A Forgotten Instrument (more information from Tihamér Romanek)
 mp3: Prelude-Presto from Lute Suite No. 1 (Lute-Harpsichord)
 mp3: Bourree from Lute Suite No. 1 (Lute-Harpsichord)
 mp3: live recording (2004) - Gaspar Sanz (info)
Photo (2)

Hungarian classical guitarists
Hungarian harpsichordists
Hungarian classical organists
Male classical organists
Year of birth missing (living people)
Living people
Hungarian lutenists
21st-century organists
21st-century Hungarian male musicians